Peacock is an English surname. Notable people with the surname include:

Musicians
Annette Peacock (born 1941), American musician
Charlie Peacock (born 1956), American musician
Dave Peacock (musician) (born 1945), English musician, one half of the duo Chas & Dave
Francis Peacock (1723–1807), Scottish writer, dancer and musician
Gary Peacock (1935–2020), American jazz double-bassist

Politicians and judges
Alexander Peacock (1861–1933), Australian politician
Andrew Peacock (1939–2021), Australian politician
Barnes Peacock (1810–1890), English judge
Barrow Peacock (born 1970), Louisiana politician
Caleb Peacock South Australian businessman and politician
Elizabeth Peacock (born 1937), British Conservative politician
Hugh Peacock, Canadian politician
John Michael Peacock, frontier leader and politician of the Cape Colony
John Thomas Peacock (1827–1905), New Zealand politician
Joseph Peacock (businessman), South Australian businessman and politician
Millie Peacock (1870–1948), Australian politician, first woman elected to the Parliament of Victoria
Peter Peacock (born 1952), Scottish politician
Stephanie Peacock (born 1986), British politician
Thomas Peacock (politician) (1837–1922), New Zealand politician

Sportspeople

American football (gridiron)
David Peacock (American football) (1890–1944), American college football player, coach and politician
Johnny Peacock (American football) (born 1947), American football player

Baseball
Brad Peacock (born 1988), American baseball pitcher
Johnny Peacock (1910–1981), American baseball catcher
Matt Peacock (baseball) (born 1994), American baseball pitcher

Football (soccer)
Alan Peacock (born 1937), English footballer
Darren Peacock (born 1968), English footballer
Ernie Peacock (1924–1973), English footballer
Keith Peacock (born 1945), English footballer
Gavin Peacock (born 1967), English footballer
Joe Peacock (1897–1979), England footballer
John Peacock (footballer) (born 1956), manager of the England national under-17 football team
Lee Peacock (born 1976), Scottish footballer
Richard Peacock (footballer) (born 1972), English footballer
Tom Peacock (1912–?), English educator and footballer

Rugby
Alfred Peacock, English rugby player
Danny Peacock (born 1968), Australian rugby player
Harry Peacock (1909–1996), Wales rugby player
Jamie Peacock (born 1977), English rugby player

Other
Daniel Peacock (cricketer) (born 1975), English cricketer
David Peacock (bowls) (born 1970), British lawn bowler
Eulace Peacock (1914–1996), American athlete
Hamish Peacock (born 1990), Australian javelin thrower
Howell Peacock (1889–1962), American college basketball coach
Jonnie Peacock (born 1993), English paralympic sprinter
Shane Peacock (ice hockey) (born 1973), Canadian ice hockey player
Stephanie Peacock (swimmer) (born 1992), American swimmer
Tyke Peacock (born 1961), American high jumper
William Peacock (water polo) (1891–1948), British water polo player

Other
Daniel Peacock (disambiguation), multiple people
David Peacock (disambiguation), multiple people
Dmitri Rudolf Peacock (1842–1892), British philologist and diplomat
Doug Peacock (disambiguation), multiple people
Edgar Peacock (1893–1955), decorated British Army officer
Edward Peacock (disambiguation), multiple people
George Peacock (disambiguation), multiple people
Ian Peacock, English broadcaster
Jamie Peacock (disambiguation), multiple people
John Peacock (disambiguation), multiple people
Laurence Peacock (active 2010s), English playwright
Mabel Peacock (1856–1920), English folklore collector
Molly Peacock (born 1947), American poet
Richard Peacock (disambiguation), multiple people
Scott Peacock (born 1963), American chef
Shane Peacock (disambiguation), multiple people
Stephanie Peacock (disambiguation), multiple people
Thomas Peacock (disambiguation), multiple people
Trevor Peacock (1931–2021), English character actor
William Peacock (disambiguation), multiple people

Fictional characters
Ashley Peacock, character in the British soap opera Coronation Street
Belinda Peacock, character in the British soap opera EastEnders
Claire Peacock, character in Coronation Street
Freddie Peacock, character in Coronation Street
Joshua Peacock, character in Coronation Street
Maxine Peacock, character in Coronation Street
Mrs. Peacock, character in the game Clue
Captain Stephen Peacock, character in the British sitcoms Are You Being Served? and Grace & Favour
Peacock, character in the video-game Skullgirls

See also
Peacock (disambiguation)
Peacocke (disambiguation), variant
Pocock

English-language surnames